Virgil Bradford "Brad" Sayre (January 3, 1912 – December 10, 1994) was an American politician who served in both houses of the West Virginia Legislature. He was the Republican nominee for state auditor in 1952, losing to incumbent Edgar B. Sims.

References

External links

1912 births
1994 deaths
Republican Party members of the West Virginia House of Delegates
Republican Party West Virginia state senators